Robert Haab (8 August 1865 – 15 October 1939) was a Swiss politician.

He was elected to the Swiss Federal Council on 13 December 1917 and handed over office on 31 December 1929. He was affiliated to the Free Democratic Party.

During his office time he held the Department of Posts and Railways and was President of the Confederation in 1922, winning by a slim majority of 163 to 154, and again 1929.

External links

Citations

1865 births
1939 deaths
People from Wädenswil
Swiss Calvinist and Reformed Christians
Free Democratic Party of Switzerland politicians
Members of the Federal Council (Switzerland)
Ambassadors of Switzerland to Germany
Swiss military officers
University of Zurich alumni
University of Strasbourg alumni
Leipzig University alumni